Dev Negi (born 25 June 1989) is an Indian singer-songwriter and a playback singer based in Mumbai, India. Negi has recorded numerous chartbuster songs for Hindi films, albums, television and TV commercials. The song Biba which is a collaboration of the international DJ Marshmello and music composer Pritam has been sung by Negi along with Shirley Setia & Pradeep Sran. His song Badri Ki Dulhania was one of the most viewed Indian songs on YouTube in 2017.

Early life
Negi hails from a hilly town Dwarahat of Almora, Uttarakhand. He has done his schooling from a local state run intermediate school. During his childhood, he used to perform in school and local cultural events and he spent his maximum time in listening to Mohammed Rafi & Kishore Kumar's songs. According to Negi, he has learnt most of the music through listening and he too mentioned Rafi saab as an institution to him. After his schooling, he moved to Jalandhar, Punjab for higher education. Negi holds a bachelor's degree in music from Apeejay College of Fine Arts and he has learned Hindustani classical music from his guru Shri Vinod Verma ji. He trained his voice there in Jalandhar and by the end of 2010 he shifted to Mumbai.

Career
Negi made his debut with the song "Aaja Ab Jee Le Zara" from the film Ankur Arora Murder Case in 2013. He sang "Hai Yehi Zindagi" (film version) for Sajid Nadiawala's Kick and the title track of Ungli in 2014. In 2015, he got noticed when his two film songs released consecutively, "Ho Gaya Hai Pyaar" from Tanu Weds Manu Returns and "Coffee Peetey Peetey" from Gabbar Is Back. These songs brought him fame but "Badri Ki Dulhania" in 2017 came out as a major milestone in his career. After that he recorded a list of major chartbusters including "Chalti Hai Kya 9 Se 12" from Judwaa 2, "Sweety Tera Drama" from Bareilly Ki Barfi, "Butterfly" from the film Jab Harry Met Sejal, "Sweatheart" from Kedarnath and many others. His song Naach Meri Jaan for the Salman Khan starrer Tubelight has the Kumaoni lyrics written by him. It was for the first time when Kumaoni language has been used in a mainstream Hindi film song. Negi has done rapping in the song "Rang Laal" from Force 2 along with John Abraham which perfectly depicts the emotions of every Indian, post the Uri terror attack and India's retaliatory surgical strike. Apart from the films, he has sung several title tracks for television including Mere Rang Mein Rangne Waali, Ek Boond Ishq, Beintehaa and Nisha Aur Uske Cousins. Besides, he has recorded songs for Punjabi, Marathi, Telugu, Bengali films. From then to now, he has shown his versatility by singing in different genres.

Personal life
Negi was born in Dwarahat on 25 June 1989. His father is an ex-army man and a former boxing player and mother is a homemaker. Negi is the youngest among his siblings. Being born and brought up in a Kumaoni – Rajput family, he has no ancestral roots to the music. However, he feels the music is always there in the beauty of hills and that has always been a big inspiration to him. In an interview, he mentioned that the feel is the most important factor in singing, particularly in playback and that feel is there in his singing due to the hills.

Discography

Hindi

Films

Non-film

Other languages

References

External links
 

1989 births
Living people
Bollywood playback singers
Indian male pop singers
Indian male songwriters
Indian male singer-songwriters
Indian singer-songwriters